Sherwood is a masculine given name which may refer to:

 Sherwood Anderson (1876–1941) American novelist and short story writer
 Sherwood Bailey (1923–1987), American child actor
 Sherwood Battle Brockwell (1885–1953), American fire marshal
 Sherwood Boehlert (born 1936), American retired politician
 Sherwood Eddy (1871–1963), American Protestant missionary, author, administrator and educator
 Sherwood Egbert (1920-1969), President of Studebaker-Packard Corporation and Studebaker Corporation from 1961 to 1963
 Sherwood Gorbach (born 1934), American medical academic
 Sherry Magee (1884-1929), American Major League Baseball player
 Sherwood Schwartz (1916-2011), American television producer
 Sherwood Schwarz (born 1930), American businessman, former owner of the Toronto Argonauts football team
 Sherwood Smith (born 1951), American fantasy and science fiction writer
 Sherwood C. Spring (born 1944), retired United States Army colonel and former NASA astronaut

Masculine given names